The 1969 Adelaide Carnival was the 17th edition of the Australian National Football Carnival, an Australian football interstate competition.

Four teams competed in the carnival, South Australia, the Victorian Football League, Tasmania and Western Australia. Victoria finished on top of the table after winning all of their games. Peter Hudson kicked 17 goals in the carnival, the next best was Austin Robertson with 15.

The Victorian Football Association was scheduled to have competed in the Carnival, but was disqualified after it allowed players to cross from the VFL to the VFA without formal clearances during the 1969 season, in defiance of an ANFC directive from the previous year.

Squads
Victoria

South Australia

Western Australia

Tasmania

Results

All-Australian team
In 1969 the All-Australian team was picked based on the Adelaide Carnival.

Tassie Medal
Peter Eakins of Western Australia and Graham Molloy of South Australia won the Tassie Medal after both tallying four votes.

References

1969 Adelaide Carnival page on Full Points Footy (Archived 2009-05-08)

Australian rules interstate football
Adelaide Carnival